W. Jones was a footballer who played on the wing for Burslem Port Vale in the early 1890s.

Career
Jones most likely joined Burslem Port Vale in the summer of 1890. He was a regular in his first season, but was selected only intermittently from February 1891. He did manage to make the first 11 in the 1892 Staffordshire Senior Cup winning side though. He was released at the end of the 1892–93 season having made 45 appearances (including one in the Second Division of the Football League, 20 in the Midland League and 21 friendlies) and scored seven goals (three in the Midland League and four in friendlies) for the Vale.

Career statistics
Source:

Honours
Port Vale
Staffordshire Senior Cup: 1892

References

Year of birth missing
Year of death missing
English footballers
Association football wingers
Port Vale F.C. players
Midland Football League players
English Football League players